The Battle of Kollaa was fought from December 7, 1939, to March 13, 1940, in Ladoga's Karelia, Finland, as a part of the Soviet-Finnish Winter War.

Description and outcome 
Despite having far fewer troops than the Soviets, the Finnish forces (12th Division) repelled the Red Army because the Soviets were only prepared to proceed along roads. With few roads in the Kollaa area, and all of them guarded by Finnish troops, the Soviets were unable to proceed cross-country without skis.

Kollaa is considered to be one of the most difficult locations to defend during the Winter War. The Red Army is estimated to have fired nearly 40,000 artillery rounds at the defence line, during a single day. In contrast, the Finnish artillery could fire a maximum of 1,000 rounds per day.

The Battle of Kollaa continued until the end of the Winter War, despite the Finnish 12th Division stopping the 8th Red Army and both sides suffering heavy losses. The Red Army managed to penetrate the Finnish defence line in Kollaa several times, pushing the Finns out of their positions. The Finns restored the integrity of their defence line through systematic counter-attacks. On March 12, near the end of the war, the Soviets managed to form a 0.5–1.5 kilometre deep fracture point in the Finnish defence line on March 12, nearly resulting in its collapse. As a result, the commander of the 12th Division of the Finnish Army considered abandoning the main defence line at Kollaa. However, as the news from the sector was that the situation was "not yet that alarming", the commander ordered a counter-attack, for the defence line to be retaken the following day. These orders were rescinded, as news of the concluded peace treaty reached the front, and the men were ordered to hold their current positions until the end of hostilities.

New expression of Finnish resolve 
A famous quote from the Battle of Kollaa is Major General Hägglund's question, "Will Kollaa hold? (Kestääkö Kollaa?)", to which Lieutenant Aarne Juutilainen replied, "Kollaa will hold (Kollaa kestää), unless the orders are to run away."  The simple question and reply have entered Finnish lexicon as an expression of perseverance and resolve in the face of impending difficulty or crisis. The Finnish punk band  uses the name.

The "White Death" 
The legendary Finnish sniper Simo Häyhä, nicknamed the "White Death", served on the Kollaa front. He is credited with only 505 confirmed kills according to Finnish military records. The true number remains contested, but is thought to be more than the official 505.

See also 

 List of Finnish military equipment of World War II
 List of Soviet Union military equipment of World War II

References 

Kollaa
1939 in Finland
1940 in Finland
December 1939 events
January 1940 events
February 1940 events
March 1940 events